The men's 50 metre breaststroke event at the 2018 Commonwealth Games was held on 8 and 9 April at the Gold Coast Aquatic Centre.

Records
Prior to this competition, the existing world, Commonwealth and Games records were as follows:

The following records were established during the competition:

Results

Heats
The heats were held on 8 April at 10:46.

Semifinals
The semifinals were held on 8 April at 20:19.

Semifinal 1

Semifinal 2

Final
The final was held on 9 April at 21:07.

References

Men's 50 metre breaststroke
Commonwealth Games